Abū Muḥammad al-Ḥusayn ibn Masʻūd ibn Muḥammad al-Farrā' al-Baghawī (Persian/Arabic:ابو محمد حسین بن مسعود بغوی), born 1041 or 1044 (433 AH or 436 AH) died 1122 (516 AH) was a renowned Persian Muslim mufassir, hadith scholar, and Shafi‘i faqih, best known for his major work Maʻālim at-Tanzīl.  Al-Farra is a reference to trading with fur, and al-Baghawī is a reference to his hometown Bagh or Baghshûr (then in Khorasan) between Herat (Afghanistan) and Marw al-Rudh. He died in Marw al-Rudh.

He is also famous for his other works on hadith such as Sharh as-Sunnah and Masabih as-Sunnah, the latter became famous as Mishkah al-Masabih with the additions of at-Tabrizi (d. 741H). He was a student of al-Qadi Husayn.

Works 

 Maʿālim at-Tanzīl also known as Tafsīr al-Baghawī (معالم التنزيل المعروف بتفسير البغوي)
 At-Tahdhīb fī Fiqh al-Imām ash-Shāfiʻī (التهذيب في فقه الإمام الشافعي)
 Sharḥ as-Sunnah (شرح السنة)
 Maṣābīḥ as-Sunnah (مصابيح السنة)
 Al-Anwār fī Shamāʼil an-Nabī al-Mukhtār (الأنوار في شمائل  النبي المختار )
 Al-Jamʻ bayn aṣ-Ṣaḥīḥayn (الجمع بين الصحيحين)
 Al-Arbaʻīn Ḥadīthā (الأربعين حديثاً)
 Majmūʻah min al-Fatāwā (مجموعة من الفتاوى)

References 

1040s births
1122 deaths
Persian Sunni Muslim scholars of Islam
Shafi'is
11th-century Muslim scholars of Islam
Hadith scholars
Quranic exegesis scholars
11th-century Iranian people
12th-century Iranian people
11th-century jurists
12th-century jurists